Stuckism is an international anti-conceptual art and pro-figurative painting art movement founded by Charles Thomson and Billy Childish in 1999. The founding group in London had 13 members. In 2000, Regan Tamanui started a group in Melbourne, Australia, and it was decided that other artists should be free to start their own groups also, named after their locality. Stuckism has since grown into an international art movement of 230 groups in 52 countries, as of April 2012. This is a list of associated artists who, unless otherwise indicated, are painters.

Key

CFS = Co-founder of the first Stuckist group
MS = Member of the first Stuckist group
F = Founder of the named group
CF = Co-founder of the named group 
M = Member of the named group
GA = Guest artist
PV = Represented in The Stuckists Punk Victorian show
Student = Student for the first Stuckist group
For groups in London and Liverpool, the name of the group is in brackets.

References
General
"Stuckist groups", stuckism.com. The source for information, unless specified otherwise.
Specific

Stuckist
Stuckism